Acarepipona insolita is a species of wasp in the family Vespidae.

References

Potter wasps